Enoch Adejare Adeboye (born 2 March 1942) is a Nigerian pastor and General Overseer of Redeemed Christian Church of God.

Early life
Enoch Adejare Adeboye was born on 2 March 1942 in Ifewara, near Ife, in the then Southern Region, British Nigeria. He was born into a very humble family.

Education 
Enoch Adejare Adeboye began his education at Ilesha Grammar School Ilesha Osun State in 1956. Enoch Adejare Adeboye then proceeded to the University of Nigeria Nsukka (UNN) in Nsukka, but because of the Nigeria Civil War, he completed his first degree in the University of Ife (now Obafemi Awolowo University), graduating with a Bachelor's degree in Mathematics in 1967. That same year, he married Foluke Adenike. They both have four children namely: Adeolu Adeboye, Bolu Adubi (née Adeboye), Dare Adeboye and Leke Adeboye. 
In 1969, he obtained a Master's degree in Hydrodynamics from University of Lagos. In 1975, he obtained a Ph.D. in Applied Mathematics from the University of Lagos.

Ministry 
Adejare Adeboye joined the Redemed Christian Church of God in 1973 and served as an interpreter before he was ordained a pastor in the church by Pa. Josiah Akindayomi in 1975. He became General Overseer of the church in 1981. For three years, he filled the role part-time at Unilorin before giving up his university position to preach full-time.

The church which was not well known before Adeboye became the General Overseer, has branches in about 198 nations as of (March 2017), including more than 14,000,000 worshipers in Nigeria.Adeboye has stated that he aims to put a church within five minutes walking distance in developing cities and five minutes driving distance in developed cities.

Adeboye is considered a preacher of the prosperity gospel, a claim he does not deny, saying that "Pentecostals have such an impact because they talk of the here and now, not just the by and by… while we have to worry about heaven, there are some things God could do for us in the here and now."

Following new legislation that placed limits on non-profit leadership to 20 years of service and less than 70 years of age, Pastor Adeboye resigned as General Overseer in 2017.

He celebrated his 80th birthday in 2022, Adeboye's foundation donated eight dialysis machines to Wuse District Hospital, together with a reverse osmosis medical water purification system and an electrical generator.

Publications 
Adeboye has written several books, including:

 Open Heavens Daily Devotional
 Lessons from the Sower
 Christian Moderator
 Deadly Enemy of Man
 Divine Favour
 Kingdom Prosperity
 Fruits of the Spirit
 God of Wonders
 God’s Remembrance and Deliverance
 Prevailing Prayers
 The Wonder Working God
 Transitions
 Mathematics & Greatness

University endowments 
Adeboye has endowed four Nigerian universities, including Obafemi Awolowo University and the University of Nigeria.

Awards and recognition
1 of the 50 most powerful people in the world by Newsweek (2008)
Adeboye was cited as one of the Top 100 most influential Africans by New African magazine in 2019.

Personal life
Adeboye married Folu Adeboye on 17 December 1967. He is a father to four children (three sons and a daughter) and several grandchildren from the marriage. Pastor Enoch Adeboye lost his son Dare Adeboye on 4 May 2021, who died at the age of 42.

See also

 T.B. Joshua
 David Oyedepo

References

External links

Pastor E. A. Adeboye at RCCG Winners Chapel Detroit

1942 births
Living people
Nigerian Pentecostal pastors
People from Osun State
Yoruba Christian clergy
University of Lagos alumni
Academic staff of the University of Lagos
University of Nigeria alumni
Yoruba–English translators
Academic staff of the University of Ilorin
Prosperity theologians